Daisuke Ikeshima (born January 30, 1975, in Ishikawa, Japan) is a retired Japanese male race walker. He set his personal best (1:19.42) in the men's 20 km on January 30, 2000, in Kobe.

International competitions

References

1975 births
Living people
Sportspeople from Ishikawa Prefecture
Japanese male racewalkers
Olympic male racewalkers
Olympic athletes of Japan
Athletes (track and field) at the 1996 Summer Olympics
Athletes (track and field) at the 2000 Summer Olympics
Universiade medalists in athletics (track and field)
Universiade bronze medalists for Japan
Medalists at the 1999 Summer Universiade
World Athletics Championships athletes for Japan
Japan Championships in Athletics winners
20th-century Japanese people
21st-century Japanese people